Aleko is a 1953 Soviet musical film directed by Sergei Sidelyov and starring Aleksandr Ognivtsev, Mark Reizen and Inna Zubkovskaya. It is based on Sergei Rachmaninoff's 1892 opera Aleko.

Cast
 Aleksandr Ognivtsev as Aleko, the smitten  
 Mark Reizen as Starik, Zyemfira's father  
 Inna Zubkovskaya as Zyemfira, the flirt  
 Svyatoslav Kuznetsov as Young Tsigan  
 B. Zlatogorova as Aleko's Mother

References

Bibliography 
 Tatiana Egorova. Soviet Film Music. Routledge, 2014.

External links 
 

1953 films
1953 musical films
Soviet opera films
1950s Russian-language films
Films based on works by Aleksandr Pushkin